The Miami Canal, or C-6 Canal, flows from Lake Okeechobee in the U.S. state of Florida to its terminus at the Miami River, which flows through downtown Miami. The canal flows in a south and southeasterly direction for approximately 77 miles, and passes through three counties: Broward, Palm Beach, and Miami-Dade. It was constructed in the early part of the 20th century to drain the Everglades Agricultural Area (EAA).  Removing the canal was proposed as part of the Restoration of the Everglades.

See also
Tamiami Canal

References
Southeast District Assessment and Monitoring Program - 

Canals in Florida
Transportation buildings and structures in Miami-Dade County, Florida
Transportation buildings and structures in Broward County, Florida
Transportation buildings and structures in Palm Beach County, Florida
Lake Okeechobee
Transportation buildings and structures in Miami